Felgueiras is a municipality in Porto District, Portugal. The current mayor is Nuno Fonseca. There are two cities located in the municipality: Felgueiras (city status received on 13 July 1990) and Lixa. The population in 2011 was 58,065, in an area of 115.74 km².

Parishes 
Administratively, the municipality is divided into 20 civil parishes (freguesias):

 Aião
 Airães
 Friande
 Idães
 Jugueiros
 Macieira da Lixa e Caramos
 Margaride (Santa Eulália), Várzea, Lagares, Varziela e Moure 
 Pedreira, Rande e Sernande
 Penacova
 Pinheiro
 Pombeiro da Ribavizela
 Refontoura
 Regilde
 Revinhade
 Sendim
 Torrados e Sousa
 Unhão e Lordelo
 Vila Cova da Lixa e Borba de Godim
 Vila Fria e Vizela (São Jorge)
 Vila Verde e Santão

Demographics 

Industry
Felgueiras is one of the biggest producers of Europe in the shoewear area.

Notable people 
 Nicolau Coelho (ca.1460 in Felgueiras – 1502, off the coast of Mozambique) was an expert Portuguese navigator and explorer during the age of discovery.

Sport 
 Álvaro Pacheco (born 25 June 1971) a Portuguese football manager and former player with over 360 club caps
 Nélson Manuel Ribeiro da Silva (born 1979), known as Nelsinho, is a Portuguese footballer with over 570 club caps
 Frederico Filipe Teixeira Ribeiro (born 1982), known as Zamorano, a Portuguese retired footballer with 376 club caps
 Daniel Ricardo da Silva Soares (born 1982), known as Dani, a Portuguese footballer with over 425 club caps
 Carlos Pedro Carvalho Sousa (born 1985), known as Pintassilgo, a Portuguese former footballer with 347 club caps 
 Tiago Moreira (born 1988) a Portuguese footballer with over 425 club caps

References

Cities in Portugal
Municipalities of Porto District
People from Felgueiras